Men with Sword is a 2016 Chinese streaming television series produced by Sohu and premiered on August 14, 2016, with 30 episodes. The all-male cast is mainly composed by members of the Taiwanese boy band SpeXial, including Eden Zhao, Evan Ma, Dylan Xiong, Ian Yi, Simon Lian, Wayne Huang and Win Feng.

A second season, also of thirty episodes and with new actors, was released on June 15, 2017. The series focuses on the power struggle of five different Kings and their closest confidants, as they must choose between loyalty, love and revenge.

Synopsis 
After more than three centuries, the Empire of Juntian begins to collapse, as three of the four major duchies - Tianquan, Tianshu, and Tianxuan - declare their independence. Ling Guang, the power-hungry king of Tianxuan, sends his close companion, the swordsman Qiu Zhen, to assassinate the Emperor. Although Qiu Zhen succeeds, he is tormented over his actions and kills himself in order to protect his king from malicious rumors, sending Ling Guang into a deep state of depression. The death of the Emperor prompts the final duke, Jian Bin, to declare his duchy Tianji an independent kingdom as well. In Tianshu, the warrior scholar Zhong Kunyi becomes a confidant of the young king Meng Zhang, who orders him to begin undermining Tianji. Meanwhile, a mysterious wandering musician of renowned beauty called Murong Li arrives in remote Tianquan, where he is doted upon by the naive and childish king Zhi Ming, who quickly becomes romantically obsessed with him.

An uneasy balance settles among the four kingdoms, maintained mostly by the military genius of Tianji's general Qi Zhikan and the political acumen of Tianxuan's deputy prime minister, Gongsun Qian. To everyone's surprise however, a fifth nation, Nansu, reveals itself when its king, Yu Qing, requests official recognition from the other four kingdoms. As the four swordsmen travel to Nansu, shifting alliances, deep emotions, and a carefully laid conspiracy of revenge spur the world towards war.

Cast
Eden Zhao as Gongsun Qian, Deputy Prime Minister of Tianxuan
Lu Yunfeng as Ling Guang, King of Tianxuan
Simon Lian as Qiu Zhen, warrior of Tianxuan and Ling Guang's close confidant
Evan Ma as Jian Bin, King of Tianji
Ian Yi as Qi Zhikan, Chief General of Tianji
Dylan Xiong as Zhong Kunyi, agricultural minister of Tianshu
Peng Yuchang as Meng Zhang, King of Tianshu
Ash Zhu as Zhi Ming, King of Tianquan. He falls deeply in love with Murong Li
Zha Jie as Murong Li, Prince of Yaoguang and the sole survivor of the Royal Family
Wayne Huang as Yu Qing, King of Nansu
Lin Fengsong as Yu Qing (second season)
Win Feng as Qi Kun, Emperor of Juntian
Yang Guang as Wei Xuanchen, the Prime Minister of Tianxuan
Ren Xuehai as Ruomu Hua, Tianji's Grand Master 
Zhu Jiazhen as Su Han, the Prime Minister of Tianshu
Dai Xuyi as Su Yan, the nephew of Su Han and Zhong Kunyi's rival
Hu Gaofeng as Weng Tong, Tianquan's Grand Tutor
Guo Xin as Mo Lan, Tianquan's Magistrate (later governor)
Sun Yi as A-Xun, Murong Li's childhood friend and former love interest
Qin Junzhe as Yu Yuankai, Nansu's Grand Tutor
Li Xizi as Li Geng Chen, an assassin under the service of Murong Li

Second season 
Yu Yijie as Yu Xiao, Yu Qing's younger brother and later King of Nansu. He develops an unrequited love towards Murong Li
Huang Qianshuo as Gu Shi'an, General of Tianxuan
Xue Xianyun as Fang Ye, loyal subordinate and personal bodyguard of Murong Li
Liu Tong as Zi Yu, Prince of Liuli
Chen Yucheng as Gen Mo Chi, Zhong Kunyi's student
Liang Bowen as Xiao Ran, General of Yaoguang
Feng Jianyu as Zuo Yi, King of Kaiyang
Xiao Meng as Qian Yuan, the talented yet mysterious inventor of Kaiyang
Wang Yuqi as Luo Min, Zhong Kunyi's student 
Liu Yuzhong as Chu Hang, Tianxuan's loyal soldier
Sun Chenlong as Xiao Pang, Zhi Ming's servant

Reception

The series was filmed during the summer of 2016. In July, the first promotional poster was released, followed by other posters and trailers featuring the characters in the following days. Despite its low budget and cast of amateur actors —seven of which were members of the Taiwanese boy band SpeXial—, the series became highly successful and received generally positive reviews. The show had over 200 million views during the premiere of the twelfth episode, while the whole drama accumulated 430 million views in total, becoming one of the ten most popular series of Sohu throughout its transmission.

However, it has suffered from interference by Chinese censors. The show was taken offline after it became popular and made available again shortly after, with a number of cuts censoring romantic scenes between the male characters.

References

External links
Official web site
Official Weibo

2016 Chinese television series debuts
2016 web series debuts
Chinese-language television shows
Censored television series
Sohu original programming
Chinese LGBT-related web series
Television censorship in China
Chinese LGBT-related television shows